Notacanthidae, the deep-sea spiny eels, are a family  of fishes found worldwide below , and as deep as . The earliest known spiny eel is Pronotacanthus sahelalmae, from the Santonian of what is now Lebanon.

Their bodies are greatly elongated, though more tapered than in true eels. The caudal fin is small or nonexistent, while the anal fin is lengthy, as long as half of the total body length. They feed on animals attached to or living on the sea floor, such as sea anemones, echinoderms, molluscs, and worms.

Although not true eels, these fish do have a similar leptocephalus larval form. However, while the larvae of true eels are about 5–10% of the length of the adult, those of deep-sea spiny eels can grow considerably larger than the adult, and shrink when they develop into their final form.

References

 
Deep sea fish
Ray-finned fish families